Joseph Wilson (11 February 1869 – 26 August 1938) was an Australian cricketer. He played one first-class match for New South Wales in 1891/92 and one first-class match for Transvaal in 1905/06.

See also
 List of New South Wales representative cricketers

References

External links
 

1869 births
1938 deaths
Australian cricketers
New South Wales cricketers
Gauteng cricketers